The 2009–10 Hannover 96 season was the 114th season in the football club's history and 21st overall and eighth consecutive season in the top flight of German football, the Bundesliga, having been promoted from the 2. Bundesliga in 2002. Hannover 96 also participated in this season's edition of the domestic cup, the DFB-Pokal. This was the 51st season for Hannover in the HDI-Arena, located in Hanover, Lower Saxony, Germany. The season covered a period from 1 July 2009 to 30 June 2010.

The season was overshadowed by the suicide of the team's captain and goalkeeper Robert Enke on 10 November 2009.

Players

Squad information

Transfers

In

Out

Competitions

Overview

Bundesliga

League table

Results summary

Results by round

Matches

DFB-Pokal

Statistics

Appearances and goals

|}

Goalscorers

Clean sheets

Disciplinary record

References

Notes

Hannover 96 seasons
Hannover 96